Mitchell Jon Reinke (born February 4, 1996) is an American professional ice hockey defenseman. He is currently playing under contract to the Wilkes-Barre/Scranton Penguins in the American Hockey League (AHL). He has formerly played with the St. Louis Blues in the National Hockey League (NHL).

Early life
Reinke was born on February 4, 1996, in St. Paul, Minnesota, to parents Chris and Mickie Reinke. He came from an athletic family as his father played hockey at Hamline University and his sister played soccer at the University of Minnesota. He also has another sister, Kelsey. Upon graduating from Hamline, his father became a masters division world championship boxer.

Playing career
Reinke attended Stillwater High before playing junior hockey with the Cedar Rapids RoughRiders of the United States Hockey League (USHL).

He committed to play collegiate hockey with Michigan Tech of the Western Collegiate Hockey Association (WCHA). In his freshman season in 2016–17 season, Reinke developed a scoring touch and sound defensive game with 20 points in 41 games to earn a selection to the WCHA All-Rookie Team.

In the following 2017–18 season, Reinke notched a new career high with 24 points in 35 games before opting to end his collegiate career after his sophomore year in signing as an Undrafted free agent to a two-year, entry-level contract with the St. Louis Blues on March 26, 2018. Reinke was immediately added to the Blues roster and made his NHL debut with the Blues in a 6–0 defeat to the Arizona Coyotes on March 31, 2018.

After spending his first three full professional seasons within the Blues organization, Reinke was not tendered a qualifying offer to be released as a free agent. On September 2, 2021, he was signed to a one-year contract to continue in the AHL with the Wilkes-Barre/Scranton Penguins, the primary affiliate to the Pittsburgh Penguins.

Career statistics

Awards and honors

References

External links

1996 births
Living people
American men's ice hockey defensemen
Cedar Rapids RoughRiders players
Michigan Tech Huskies men's ice hockey players
Ice hockey players from Minnesota
People from Stillwater, Minnesota
St. Louis Blues players
San Antonio Rampage players
Undrafted National Hockey League players
Utica Comets players
Wilkes-Barre/Scranton Penguins players